Palpita is a genus of moths of the family Crambidae. Members of the moth genus Stemorrhages may be very similar in appearance.

Species

Palpita aenescentalis Munroe, 1952
Palpita aethrophanes (Meyrick, 1934)
Palpita albifulvata Kirti & Rose, 1992
Palpita angusta Inoue, 1997
Palpita annulata (Fabricius, 1794)
Palpita annulifer Inoue, 1996
Palpita approximalis (Hampson, 1918)
Palpita argoleuca (Meyrick, 1938)
Palpita arsaltealis (Walker, 1859)
Palpita asiaticalis Inoue, 1994
Palpita aureolina Inoue, 1997
Palpita australica Inoue, 1996
Palpita austrannulata Inoue, 1996
Palpita austrounionalis Inoue, 1997
Palpita bakerialis (Schaus, 1927)
Palpita bambusalis (Moore, 1888)
Palpita bicornuta Inoue, 1996
Palpita bonjongalis
Palpita braziliensis Munroe, 1959
Palpita brevimarginata (Janse, 1924)
Palpita candicantis Inoue, 1997
Palpita candidalis (Dognin, 1904)
Palpita candidata Inoue, 1996
Palpita carbonifusalis (Hampson, 1918)
Palpita cincinnatalis Munroe, 1952
Palpita cirralis (Swinhoe, 1897)
Palpita cirrhopis (Meyrick, 1937)
Palpita citrina (Druce, 1902)
Palpita claralis (Walker, 1866)
Palpita conclusalis (Walker, 1866)
Palpita conistolalis (Hampson, 1918)
Palpita contrangusta Inoue, 1997
Palpita crococosta Inoue, 1997
Palpita curiosa Inoue, 1996
Palpita curvilinea (Janse, 1924)
Palpita curvispina Zhang & Li, 2005
Palpita diehli Inoue, 1996
Palpita disjunctalis Inoue, 1999
Palpita dispersalis Inoue, 1996
Palpita elealis (Walker, 1859)
Palpita ensiforma Inoue, 1996
Palpita eribotalis (Walker, 1859)
Palpita estebanalis (Schaus, 1920)
Palpita eupilosalis Inoue, 1997
Palpita flegia (Cramer, 1777)
Palpita florensis Inoue, 1996
Palpita forficifera Munroe, 1959
Palpita fraterna (Moore, 1888)
Palpita freemanalis Munroe, 1952
Palpita gracialis (Hulst, 1886)
Palpita grandifalcata Inoue, 1997
Palpita griseofascialis Inoue, 1997
Palpita hexcornutialis Kirti & Rose, 1992
Palpita hollowayi Inoue, 1997
Palpita homalia Inoue, 1996
Palpita horakae Inoue, 1997
Palpita horocrates (Meyrick, 1937)
Palpita hyaloptila (Turner, 1915)
Palpita hypohomalia Inoue, 1996
Palpita hypomelas (Hampson, 1899)
Palpita illibalis (Hübner, 1818)
Palpita illustrata Inoue, 1997
Palpita inconspicua Inoue, 1996
Palpita indannulata Inoue, 1996
Palpita indistans (Moore, 1888)
Palpita inexpectalis Inoue, 1996
Palpita inusitata (Butler, 1879)
Palpita irroratalis (Hampson, 1912)
Palpita isoscelalis (Guenée, 1854)
Palpita jacobsalis (Marion & Viette, 1956)
Palpita jairusalis (Walker, 1859)
Palpita jansei Munroe, 1977
Palpita javanica Inoue, 1997
Palpita junctalis Inoue, 1997
Palpita kimballi Munroe, 1959
Palpita kiminensis Kirti & Rose, 1992
Palpita laciniata Inoue, 1997
Palpita lanceolata Inoue, 1996
Palpita lautopennis Inoue, 1997
Palpita limbata (Butler, 1886)
Palpita lobisignalis (Hampson, 1918)
Palpita longissima Inoue, 1996
Palpita luzonica Inoue, 1996
Palpita magniferalis (Walker, 1861)
Palpita majorina Inoue, 1997
Palpita margaritacea Inoue, 1997
Palpita marginalis Inoue, 1997
Palpita maritima Sullivan & Solis, 2013
Palpita masuii Inoue, 1996
Palpita melanapicalis Inoue, 1996
Palpita metallata (Fabricius, 1781)
Palpita micronesica Inoue, 1997
Palpita microptera Inoue, 1996
Palpita minuscula Inoue, 1996
Palpita monomaculalis Inoue, 1997
Palpita munroei Inoue, 1996
Palpita nigricollis (Snellen, 1895)
Palpita nigropunctalis (Bremer, 1864)
Palpita nonfraterna Inoue, 1996
Palpita notabilis Inoue, 1997
Palpita oblita (Moore, 1888)
Palpita obsolescens Inoue, 1997
Palpita ocelliferalis (Hampson, 1912)
Palpita ochrocosta Inoue, 1996
Palpita pajnii Kirti & Rose, 1992
Palpita pallescens Inoue, 1996
Palpita palpifulvata  Kirti & Rose, 1992
Palpita pandurata Inoue, 1996
Palpita parvifraterna Inoue, 1999
Palpita paulianalis (Marion & Viette, 1956)
Palpita perlucidalis Inoue, 1999
Palpita persicalis (Amsel, 1951)
Palpita persimilis Munroe, 1959
Palpita perunionalis Inoue, 1994
Palpita phaealis (Hampson, 1913)
Palpita picticostalis (Hampson, 1896)
Palpita pilosalis Inoue, 1997
Palpita postundulata Inoue, 1997
Palpita pratti (Janse, 1924)
Palpita pudicalis (Kenrick, 1907)
Palpita pulverulenta (Hampson, 1918)
Palpita punctalis (Warren, 1896)
Palpita quadristigmalis (Guenée, 1854)
Palpita quasiannulata Inoue, 1996
Palpita rhodocosta Inoue, 1997
Palpita roboralis Inoue, 1996
Palpita robusta (Moore, 1888)
Palpita rotundalis Inoue, 1997
Palpita seitzialis (E. Hering, 1903)
Palpita sejunctalis Inoue, 1997
Palpita semifraterna Inoue, 1996
Palpita semimicroptera Inoue, 1996
Palpita seminigralis (Hampson, 1899)
Palpita shafferi Inoue, 1996
Palpita simplicissima Inoue, 1997
Palpita sphenocosma (Meyrick, 1894)
Palpita spilogramma (Meyrick, 1934)
Palpita spinosa Clayton, 2008
Palpita stenocraspis
Palpita subillustrata Inoue, 1997
Palpita submarginalis (Walker, 1866)
Palpita syleptalis (Hampson, 1899)
Palpita tenuijuxta Inoue, 1996
Palpita travassosi Munroe, 1959
Palpita trifurcata Munroe, 1959
Palpita triopis (Hampson, 1912)
Palpita tsisabiensis Maes, 2004
Palpita uedai Inoue, 1997
Palpita varii Munroe, 1977
Palpita venatalis (Schaus, 1920)
Palpita viettei Munroe, 1959
Palpita viriditinctalis (Hampson, 1918)
Palpita vitiensis Clayton, 2008
Palpita vitrealis (Rossi, 1794)
Palpita warrenalis (Swinhoe, 1894)
Palpita xanthyalinalis (Hampson, 1899)

Former species
Palpita aequorea (Meyrick, 1933)
Palpita ardealis (C. Felder, R. Felder & Rogenhofer, 1875)
Palpita atrisquamalis (Hampson, 1912)
Palpita caecigena (Meyrick, 1933)
Palpita celsalis (Walker, 1859)
Palpita guttulosa (Walker, 1863)
Palpita iospora (Meyrick, 1936)
Palpita marginata (Hampson, 1893)
Palpita rubritactalis (Hampson, 1918)
Palpita schroederi (Strand, 1912)
Palpita tritonalis (Snellen, 1895)

Status unknown
Palpita nivea (Linnaeus, 1767), originally described as Phalaena (Noctua) nivea from either Norway or South America.

References

 , 1994: Two new species of the genus Palpita Hübner from southeast Asia (Lepidoptera: Pyralidae: Pyraustinae). Tyô to Ga 45 (2): 97-104. Full article: .
 , 1996: Revision of the genus Palpita Hübner (Crambidae: Pyraustinae) from the Eastern Palaearctic, Oriental and Australian Region. Part 1. Tinea 15 (1): 12-46.
 , 1997: Revision of the genus Palpita Hübner (Crambidae: Pyraustinae) from the Eastern Palaearctic, Oriental and Australian Region. Part 2. Tinea 15 (2): 131-181.
 , 1999: Revision of the genus Palpita Hübner (Crambidae: Pyraustinae) from the Eastern Palaearctic, Oriental and Australian Region. Part 3. Tinea 16 (1): 52-60.
 , 1992: Studies on Indian species of the genus Palpita Hübner (Lepidoptera: Pyralidae: Pyraustinae). Journal of Entomological Research 16 (1): 62-77.
 , 1952: The Illibalis Group of the genus Palpita Hübner (Lepidoptera: Pyralidae). The Canadian Entomologist 84: 43-55.
 , 1959: New species and subspecies of Palpita (Lepidoptera: Pyralidae). The Canadian Entomoligist 91: 641-650.
 , 1977: Two species of Palpita Hübner described by Janse, with descriptions of new species (Lepidoptera: Pyralidae: Pyraustinae). The Canadian Entomologist 109 : 67-76.
 , 2013: A new species of Palpita (Crambidae, Spilomelinae) from the coastal plains of southeastern United States. Zookeys 64: 3-9. Abstract and full article: .
 , 2005: A taxonomic study on Palpita Hübner from China (Lepidoptera: Crambidae: Pyraustinae: Spilomelini). Acta Zootaxonomica Sinica 30 (1): 144-149. Abstract and full article: .

External links
 Crambidae genus list at Butterflies and Moths of the World of the Natural History Museum
 Palpita persimilis on the UF / IFAS Featured Creatures website.

 
Crambidae genera
Taxa named by Jacob Hübner